The Royal Montreal Golf Club (French: Le Club de Golf Royal Montréal) is the oldest golf club in North America, and the oldest in continuous existence. In 2023, it will be celebrating 150 years.  It was founded in Montreal by eight men in 1873. Permission was granted by Queen Victoria to use the prefix "Royal" in 1884.

History
The club's first course was a 9-hole layout on Fletcher's Field in Mount Royal Park, which the red-coated golfers shared with the public on the then outskirts of Montreal. Mr. Alexander Dennistoun, a Scottish born man, is known as the first Club's Captain. The club continues to recognize his name in honouring the men's club champion trophy. The first woman to join, and the first female member of any golf club in North America, Mrs. William Wallace Watson (née Florence Stancliffe), was elected in 1891. The Ladies' Branch of the Royal Montreal Golf Club followed.

The club has since moved twice. First to Dixie in the parish of Dorval in 1896; three years later the Ladies moved into their own clubhouse. The main clubhouse there is now the Saint Anne Academy, formerly Queen of Angels Academy, an all-girl private secondary school. In 1888, Queen of Angels Academy was founded by the Congregation of the Sisters of Sainte-Anne. It was only in 1959 that the Sisters purchased the Royal Montreal Colf Clubhouse which remained home to Queen of Angels Academy secondary school until 2014. After which was turned into the new bilingual private elementary school called Sainte-Anne Academy.
Charles Murray served as the head professional at Royal Montreal from 1905 until his death in 1938.

In 1959 the pressures of urban growth once again dictated a move, to its current location in Île-Bizard, Quebec.  Forty-five holes were constructed by American golf course architect Dick Wilson. The Blue Course is routinely cited as a preeminent Canadian golf course and among the best in the world.

Royal Montreal was one of the five founding Clubs of the Royal Canadian Golf Association, established in 1895 as the governing body of golf in Canada.  Among other duties it organizes the major national championships, including the Canadian Open, the first of which was played at Royal Montreal in 1904.

Royal Montreal hosted the Presidents Cup in 2007 and the Canadian Open in July 2014.  The Presidents Cup will once again be presented on the blue course at Royal Montreal Golf Club in September 2024.

Club professionals

See also
List of golf clubs granted Royal status
List of Canadian organizations with royal patronage
List of golf courses in Quebec

References

External links

 List of Civilian organizations with prefix "Royal" - Heritage Canada.
 List of civilian organizations with the prefix "Royal" prepared by the Department of Canadian Heritage
Course rankings

Golf clubs and courses in Quebec
Sports venues completed in 1873
Organizations based in Canada with royal patronage
L'Île-Bizard–Sainte-Geneviève
Sports venues in Montreal
1873 establishments in Quebec
Canadian Open (golf)
Royal golf clubs